The Age of the Crisis of Man: Thought and Fiction in America, 1933–1973 is a historical treatment of fiction, culture, and evolving ideology in American life written by Mark Greif and published by the Princeton University Press.

References

External links 

 
 Interview with Princeton University Press

American non-fiction books
American history books
Comparative literature
Princeton University Press books
2015 non-fiction books